Mount Mather can refer to

 Mount Mather (Alaska) in the Alaska Range
 Mount Mather (Antarctica) in the Prince Charles Mountains of Antarctica
 Mount Mather (British Columbia), a peak in British Columbia